LKL or Lkl may refer to:

 Lietuvos Krepšinio Lyga, the Lithuanian Basketball League
 Lakselv Airport, Banak, Norway, IATA airport code
 Lakeland (Amtrak station), Florida, US, Amtrak station code